Chiclet, Chiclets, or Chicklet can refer to:

 Chiclets, a brand of candy-coated chewing gum, named after chicle, from which the gum was originally made
 Chiclet keyboard, characterized by small keys that resemble Chiclets
 Chicklet, a small or young chick

See also
 Chick (disambiguation)
 Chick lit, a genre of contemporary fiction targeted at younger women popular in the last thirty years, exemplified by Bridget Jones' Diary
 Chicle, a gum from Manilkara trees